Joshua Leonard Nesbitt (born April 15, 1988) is a former American football safety for the Buffalo Bills of the National Football League (NFL). He was formerly the starting quarterback for the Georgia Tech Yellow Jackets.

High school career 
Nesbitt attended Greene County High School in Greensboro, Georgia from 2003–2007. He was regarded as Georgia's number one recruit at quarterback as a senior and the number 12 QB in the nation. Nesbitt was named to the Scout.com national Hot 100 (No. 76) and the Rivals 250, and was the No. 4 overall prospect in Georgia according to Scout.com. He was also rated the No. 9 dual-threat quarterback in the nation by Rivals. Nesbitt was a two-time, first-team all-state selection and the Class AA Offensive Player of the Year as a junior. He was named to the Atlanta Journal-Constitution Super Southern 100 and preseason Super 11 team before his senior year.

As a junior at Greene County High under Coach Larry Milligan, Nesbitt passed for 2,833 yards with 31 touchdowns, while rushing for 1,252 yards and 22 scores. As a senior, he passed for 2,256 yards and 32 touchdowns with just four interceptions, and 134-of-222 passes completed. Nesbitt also rushed for 493 yards on 93 carries and scored eight touchdowns. He added four interceptions in two seasons on defense.

College career

Freshman season
As Taylor Bennett's backup, Nesbitt was brought in for rushing during his freshman season under coach Chan Gailey.

Sophomore season
In 2008, Nesbitt earned the starting quarterback job under new Tech coach Paul Johnson for his option offense.

Junior season
The 2009 season saw Nesbitt rush for 1037 yards and 18 touchdowns. Nesbitt also had 1701 yards through the air with 10 touchdowns. He led the Yellow Jackets to an ACC Championship Game and a BCS bowl game. The Jackets finished the season with an 11-3 record following the 2010 FedEx Orange Bowl loss to Iowa. Nesbitt was honored as the 2009 ACC first-team quarterback. He was joined on the all-conference team by Jonathan Dwyer, Demaryius Thomas, Cord Howard, Sean Bedford, Derrick Morgan, and Morgan Burnett, all of whom were on the 2009 Georgia Tech Yellow Jackets football team alongside Nesbitt.

Senior season
After returning for his senior year, Nesbitt suffered a broken right arm after attempting a tackle on November 4, 2010 vs. Virginia Tech. He missed the remainder of the season, but not before setting some impressive records at his position. With 2,806 career rushing yards, Nesbitt rushed for more yards than any quarterback in ACC history and over 1,000 yards more than any quarterback in Georgia Tech history. He also rushed for 35 career touchdowns— six more than any quarterback in the history of the ACC and 16 more than any Yellow Jacket quarterback before him.

Professional career 
Nesbitt went undrafted in the 2011 NFL Draft but was signed by the Buffalo Bills as a Defensive Back. On September 3, 2011, he was cut from the Bills' final 53-man roster, but was signed to the practice squad the following day. Nesbitt was signed to the Bills 53-man roster as a safety on November 15, 2011. He was waived/injured by the Bills on August 22, 2012, and subsequently reverted to injured reserve on August 24.

See also
 List of Georgia Tech Yellow Jackets starting quarterbacks
 Georgia Tech Yellow Jackets football statistical leaders
 2008 Georgia Tech Yellow Jackets football team
 2009 Georgia Tech Yellow Jackets football team
 2010 Georgia Tech Yellow Jackets football team

References 

1988 births
Living people
American football quarterbacks
American football safeties
Buffalo Bills players
Georgia Tech Yellow Jackets football players
People from Greensboro, Georgia
Players of American football from Georgia (U.S. state)
African-American players of American football
21st-century African-American sportspeople
20th-century African-American people